This is a chronological list of presidents of the Constitutional Court of Turkey since the establishment of the institution in 1962.

See also
 Judicial system of Turkey

Sources
 Constitution of Turkey Web site 

Constitutional Court of Turkey
Presidents of the Constitutional Court